= Scandinavian Academy of Industrial Engineering and Management =

- Formation: 2012
- Type: Learned society
- Headquarters: Gothenburg, Sweden
- Location: Stiftelsen IMIT, 41296 GÖTEBORG, SVERIGE
- Members: approx. ~600
- President: Professor Mats Engwall
- Website: http://scaiem.org

The Scandinavian Academy of Industrial Engineering and Management (ScAIEM), established in 2012, is a scholarly association comprising members from Iceland, Norway, Denmark, Sweden, and Finland. The organization promotes collaboration, knowledge exchange, and the dissemination of best practices among universities offering educational programs in the field of Industrial Engineering and Management (IEM).

In Sweden and Norway, the discipline is traditionally referred to as industriell ekonomi and industriell økonomi, respectively. These national terms, however, do not fully align with the internationally recognized designation Industrial Engineering and Management, which more comprehensively reflects the interdisciplinary nature and global scope of the field.

== Annual conference ==
ScAIEM host an annual conference to promote education, research, and application of the field of IEM in the Nordic region. The first conference was arranged in November 2013.

ScAIEM is governed by a board of seven elected board members from its member institutions. The IMIT foundation in Gothenburg is the secretariat of ScAIEM.

So far 12 conferences have been held at the following venues:

- Lund University (2013), Sweden
- Aalto University (2014), Finland
- Technical University of Denmark (2015)
- Luleå University of Technology (2016), Sweden
- Norwegian University of Science and Technology (2017)
- University of Oulu, Finland (2018)
- KTH Royal Institute of Technology, Sweden (2019)
- Technical University of Denmark (DTU) (virtual), Denmark (2020)
- Technical University of Denmark (DTU) (virtual), Denmark (2021)
- Uppsala University, Sweden (2022)
- University of South-Eastern Norway, Kongsberg (2023)
- Chalmers University of Technology, Sweden (2024)
- University of Iceland, Reykjavik (2025)
